Gisela Pankow (25 February 1914 – 14 August 1998) was a French psychoanalyst.

1914 births
1998 deaths
French psychoanalysts
20th-century French physicians